In Norse mythology, Dvalinn is a dwarf (Hjort) who appears in several Old Norse tales and kennings. The name translates as "the dormant one" or "the one slumbering" (akin to the Danish and Norwegian "dvale" and Swedish "dvala", meaning "sleep", "unconscious condition" or "hibernation"). Dvalinn is listed as one of the four stags of Yggdrasill in both Grímnismál from the Poetic Edda and Gylfaginning from the Prose Edda.

Attestation

Poetic Edda
In the Poetic Edda poem Völuspá, Dvalinn is mentioned as a name in the listing of dwarves, and again in a later stanza as a leader taking a host of dwarfs from the mountains to find a new dwelling place:

"The rocks they left, and through wet lands
They sought a home, in the fields of sand"

In Hávamál, Dvalinn is said to have introduced the writing of runes to the dwarfs, as Dáinn had done for the elves and Odin for the gods.

In Alvíssmál, a kenning for the sun is listed as the "deceiver of Dvalinn", referring to the sun's power of turning dwarfs into stone. In skaldic poetry, "Dvalinn's drink" is used as a kenning for poetry, since the mead of poetry was originally created by the dwarfs.

In Fáfnismál, during a discussion between Sigurd and Fafnir concerning the minor Norns (apart from the three great Norns), those who govern the lives and destinies of dwarfs are also known as "Dvalinn's daughters".

Sagas
In Hervarar saga, Dvalinn is one of a pair of dwarves (including Durin) who forged the magic sword Tyrfing.

Sörla þáttr
In the Sörla þáttr, an Icelandic short story written by two Christian priests in the 15th century, Dvalinn is the name of one of the four dwarves (including Alfrigg, Berling and Grer) who fashioned a necklace which was later acquired by a woman called Freyja, who is King Odin's concubine, after she agreed to spend a night with each of them.

Kálfsvísa
In the Kálfsvísa, Dvalinn is mentioned in a list of Norse heroes riding their horses onto the ice. Dvalinn rides a horse named Móðnir ("Spirited").

Modern influence
J. R. R. Tolkien took the name as Dwalin for one of the dwarves in The Hobbit.
Rich Burlew has Dvalin as the first king of the Dwarves, an ascended demigod of the Northern Pantheon in The Order of the Stick. In Joanne Harris' The Gospel of Loki, Dvalin is the name of one of the Sons of Ivaldi. In Genshin Impact, Dvalin is the name of a member of the Four Winds in Mondstadt created by the God of the wind, Barbatos.

Footnotes

References
 The Sagas of Icelanders: A Selection (London: Penguin, 2001)

Norse dwarves
Swordsmiths
Tyrfing cycle